Jan Šourek (born 2 September 1887, date of death unknown) was a Czech rower. He competed in the men's single sculls event at the 1912 Summer Olympics, representing Bohemia.

References

External links
 

1887 births
Year of death missing
People from Jablonec nad Nisou District
People from the Kingdom of Bohemia
Czech male rowers
Olympic rowers of Bohemia
Rowers at the 1912 Summer Olympics
Sportspeople from the Liberec Region
Rowers from the Austro-Hungarian Empire